Plymouth Argyle Football Club is an English association football club based in Plymouth, Devon. Founded in 1886 as Argyle Football Club, they became a professional club in January 1903, and were elected to the Southern League ahead of the 1903–04 season. The club won the Southern League championship in 1913 and finished as runners-up on two occasions, before being elected to the Football League in 1920, where they compete to this day, as a founder member of the Third Division. Argyle won their first Football League championship, and promotion to the Second Division for the first time, ten years later in 1930. As of 2010, the club has won five championships in the Football League, gained promotion on eight occasions, and been relegated eight times. Four of those league championships were won in the third tier, which is a divisional record. Argyle have made one appearance at Wembley Stadium, in which they won the 1996 Third Division play-off final. The club has also achieved moderate success in domestic cup competitions; they reached the semi-finals of the FA Cup in 1984, and the quarter-finals in 2007. Argyle have also reached the semi-finals of the League Cup twice, in 1965 and 1974.

The Plymouth Argyle Player of the Year award is voted for annually by the club's supporters. It recognises the best overall performance by an individual player through the course of the season. Each year, the winner is presented with the trophy on the pitch at Home Park before the club's last home game of the season. This is the more prestigious of the two awards made by Plymouth Argyle itself, with the other being the Young Player of the Year accolade. Since its inception in 1966, thirty-nine different players have won the award. Six of these players have lifted the award for a second time, the most recent being Welsh international Carl Fletcher. As of the 2010–11 season, only striker Tommy Tynan has received the award for a third time. Three players have lifted the trophy in consecutive seasons; the first was Paul Mariner in 1976. Steve McCall matched that feat in the 1994, and Carl Fletcher became the third in 2011. Seven winners of the award have represented their country at international level. Six winners have gone on to become the club's manager. The 2012–13 winner was Onismor Bhasera, who made 46 appearances in all competitions during the campaign. Top goalscorer Reuben Reid won the award the following season, becoming the first forward to win the award since Mickey Evans.

Table key

Winners

.

By player

By country

Footnotes
A. : The official level of competition in the structure of the English football league system.
B. : Winning players are sourced to Danes (2009), up to and including the 2008–09 season, and to the official Plymouth Argyle website as appropriate thereafter. Players that have been inducted into the club's Hall of Fame, created in 2004 to mark their 100th season as a professional club, are sourced to Cowdery & Curno (2009), up to and including the 2008–09 season, and to the official Plymouth Argyle website as appropriate thereafter.
C. : For a detailed description of playing positions, see Association football positions.
D. : Appearances made and goals scored are sourced to Danes (2009), up to and including the 2008–09 season, and Soccerbase as appropriate thereafter. All appearances made and goals scored during their career with the club are included.
E. : Caps earned at international level are sourced to Danes (2009), up to and including the 2008–09 season, and the relevant player reference thereafter.

F. : The first winner of the award in 1966.Danes (2009), Complete Record, pp. 110–111.
G. : Piper won four caps for the England U23 team,"Norman Piper profile" . Plymouth Argyle. 26 October 2009. Retrieved 18 August 2010. and two caps for England B.
H. : Burnside earned one cap for England at U23 level.Danes (2009), Complete Record, p. 86.
I. : Mariner was the first player to win the award twice, and in consecutive seasons.Cowdery & Curno (2009), Miscellany, p. 24.
J. : Won the award on two occasions.
K. : Holds club record for appearances made; eighth overall for goals scored.Cowdery & Curno (2009), Miscellany, p. 157.
L. : The first player to lift the trophy on three occasions.Danes (2009), Complete Record, p. 123.
M. : Shared award.Cowdery & Curno (2009), Miscellany, p. 110.
N. : Included in the Team of the Century while still a member of the squad."Graham Coughlan profile" . Plymouth Argyle. 15 October 2009. Retrieved 18 August 2010.
O. : 2009 Hall of Fame inductee."Hall of Fame" . Plymouth Argyle. 3 May 2009. Retrieved 8 August 2010.
P. : 2010 Hall of Fame inductee."Mickey Evans profile" . Plymouth Argyle. 15 October 2009. Retrieved 8 August 2010.

References
General

Specific

External links
Plymouth Argyle F.C. official website
Plymouth Argyle F.C. archive

Player Of The Year
Player Of The Year
Plymouth Argyle Player Of The Year
Association football player non-biographical articles